Damien Desprat (born September 14, 1974 in France) is a Monégasque Olympic sailor, who specializes in Lasers. He competed at the 2012 Summer Olympics in the Men's Laser class, finishing in 45th place in the heats, failing to qualify for the semifinals. Desprat was also Monaco's flag bearer during the Closing Ceremony.

Olympic results

References

Living people
Olympic sailors of Monaco
Monegasque male sailors (sport)
Sailors at the 2012 Summer Olympics – Laser
1974 births